Henry James Clark (July 22, 1826 – July 1, 1873) was an American naturalist.

Biography
He was born in Easton, Massachusetts, July 22, 1826. He graduated at New York University 1848; became a pupil of Asa Gray at the Cambridge botanical garden; graduated at the Lawrence Scientific School at Harvard 1854; assistant to Louis Agassiz till 1863, and also for three years adjunct Professor of Zoology at the Lawrence Scientific School; Professor of Natural Sciences in Pennsylvania State College, near Bellefonte, 1866–69; Professor of Natural History in University of Kentucky, Lexington, 1869–72; Professor of Veterinary Science in Massachusetts Agricultural College, Amherst, from 1872 until his death there July 1, 1873. He contributed to the Smithsonian publications, to the Proceedings of the American Academy of Arts and Sciences, and to other learned periodicals. Author of Mind in Nature (Cambridge, 1863) and of the Mode of Development of Animals (New York, 1865). See A. S. Packard, Jr.'s Memoir in Biographical Memoirs of the National Academy of Sciences (Washington, 1877).

In later life, he used the double-barrelled surname James-Clark.

References

External links
Memoir by Packard at Google Books accessed January 29, 2008
National Academy of Sciences Biographical Memoir

1826 births
1873 deaths
American naturalists
Harvard School of Engineering and Applied Sciences alumni
Harvard University staff
Pennsylvania State University faculty
University of Kentucky faculty
People from Easton, Massachusetts
University of Massachusetts Amherst faculty